Liogluta falcata is a species of rove beetles first found in Turkey.

References

External links

Aleocharinae
Beetles described in 2010